"No Fool, No More" is a song by American female group En Vogue. It was written by Diane Warren and recorded for the soundtrack to the romantic drama film Why Do Fools Fall in Love (1998), while production was helmed by Big Baby and Sugar Mike. The song was released as the album's lead single and reached the top 40 on the US Hot R&B/Hip-Hop Songs and the New Zealand Singles Chart. "No Fool, No More" was later included on their 1998 hits compilation album Best of En Vogue.

Critical reception
Larry Flick of Billboard wrote, "The soundtrack to "Why Do Fools Fall In Love ?" spawns a potential smash in the form of this smooth slow jam. The members of En Vogue are at their harmonious best here—no surprise, right? Considering the lackluster tone of much of the group's last album, "EV3", it kinda is. The members have clearly rediscovered their groove, and their chemistry is now stronger than ever. Producers Big Baby and Sugar Mike dress the ladies in subtle retro-funk instrumentation, keeping the gimmicks to a bare minimum. One listen to this gorgeous recording is simply not enough. You have to go back and listen to it again and again and again."

Commercial reception
The song became a minor pop and R&B hit in the US, UK, and New Zealand. The single peaked in the Top 40 on Billboard's Hot R&B Songs, Hot 100 at #57, and Top 40 on New Zealand Top Singles chart. In 1998, the award-winning group promoted the song by performing on several day time talk shows, including The Rosie O'Donnell Show, The Oprah Winfrey Show and The Tonight Show.

Track listing

Notes
 denotes additional producer(s)

Personnel
Credits adapted from the liner notes of Why Do Fools Fall in Love soundtrack.

Lead Vocals, Backing Vocals – Cindy Herron, Terry Ellis, Maxine Jones
Arranged [Strings] – Big Baby
Bass – Dominick Maybank
Drums [Live] – Michael Allen
Engineer [Assisted] – Milton Chan
Guitar – Bernard Grobman

Mastered By – Steve Hall
Programming, Instruments – Flavahood
Remix, Engineer, Mixed – Ben Arrindell
Mixed, Compose – Diane Warren 
Producer – Darryl 'Big Baby' McClary, Michael 'Sugar Mike' Allen

Charts

References

External links
 En Vogue "No Fool, No More" Single at amazon
 En Vogue "No Fool, No More" - US Single at Discogs

1998 singles
En Vogue songs
Songs written by Diane Warren
1998 songs
East West Records singles